"Deutscher Girls" is a song by Adam and the Ants. Included in the 1978 Derek Jarman film Jubilee, in which Adam Ant appears as "The Kid", it was not released as a single until 12 February 1982.

History
"Deutscher Girls" was written by Adam Ant, and was an early fan favourite among "Antpeople". The song was first recorded in August 1977 at Free Range Studios with Mark Ryan on guitar; this version appears in the actual film (in the same scene depicted on the single sleeve). It was performed at a John Peel session on 23 January 1978, with new guitarist Johnny Bivouac. The song was re-recorded from scratch on the following day for the soundtrack album. "Deutscher Girls" and "Plastic Surgery", also from the Jubilee soundtrack, were the first Adam and the Ants tracks committed to vinyl. The latter song was recorded in July 1977 at Chappels Studios, with a minor overdub added to the guitar break during the 24 January session.

Both songs were regularly featured in the live set of the original Ants between May 1977 and January 1980, with "Plastic Surgery" (often used as set opener during 1977-1978) continuing to be performed by the "new" Ants (including Marco Pirroni and two drummers) on tours in 1980. Both songs have been frequently revived for live concert use since 2010.

Single
Adam and the Ants had achieved massive success with their 1980 album Kings of the Wild Frontier. It was the UK's top selling album of 1981 (having been the 48th-best seller in 1980), and won Best British Album at the 1982 Brit Awards.

As "Antmusic for Sex People" was sweeping through Britain, Adam Ant's former label E.G. Records decided to cash in his success by releasing "Deutscher Girls" as a 7" single. "Plastic Surgery" was released on the B-side. Released on 12 February 1982, it reached number thirteen on the UK Singles Chart. Chronologically, it followed "Ant Rap", and included the long-departed line-up of Ants Dave Barbarossa on drums, Johnny Bivouac on guitar and Andy Warren on bass guitar.

It was the second-to-last single by Adam and the Ants. Later in 1982, another of Adam and the Ants' former labels, Do It Records, released "Friends" b/w "Kick"/"Physical" from the Dirk Wears White Sox recording session at Sound Development in August 1979.

Lyrics
"Deutscher Girls" was inspired by the controversial art film Portiere Di Notte (The Night Porter) by director Liliana Cavani, and starring Dirk Bogarde (after whom Adam and the Ants' 1979 debut album Dirk Wears White Sox is named) and Charlotte Rampling. The 1974 Italian film featured elements of Nazisploitation; Bogarde plays a former Nazi, and Rampling a former concentration camp inmate.

Lyrics were changed from the original Jubilee version when it was released as a single three years later. The line "So, why did you have to be so Nazi" was changed to "So, why did you have to be so nasty", and "Camp 49 way down on the Rhine" was changed to "A lover of mine from down on the Rhine". Adam Ant told Sounds:

References

External links

1982 singles
Adam and the Ants songs
Songs written by Adam Ant
1978 songs